Troszczyno  (German: Friedrichsgnade) is a village in the administrative district of Gmina Radowo Małe, within Łobez County, West Pomeranian Voivodeship, in north-western Poland.

See also
History of Pomerania

References

Troszczyno